Markkus Pulk (born on 26 June 1996 in Keila), professionally known as Nublu (stylized as nublu) is an Estonian rapper.

Discography
 2018:	single "Mina ka"
 2019:	single "Muusikakool"
 2019:	single "Mesimagus"
 2020: album "Café Kosmos"

References

1996 births
Living people
Estonian rappers
People from Keila